Holden is a surname. Notable people with the surname include:

A–E
 Alexandra Holden (born 1977), American actress
 Albert Fairchild Holden (1866–1913), founder of Holden Arboretum in Kirtland, Ohio
 Amanda Holden (born 1971), English actress
 Amanda Holden (writer) (born 1948), British music writer and translator
 Andy Holden (footballer) (born 1962), Welsh footballer
 Andy Holden (artist) (born 1982), English artist
 Andy Holden (athlete) (1948–2014), English long-distance runner John Andrew Holden
 Anthony Holden (born 1947), British journalist
 Arthur Holden (footballer), English footballer
 Beverly Holden, All-American Girls Professional Baseball League player
 Bill Holden (baseball) (1889–1971), American baseball player
 Bill Holden (footballer) (1928–2011), English footballer
 Bill Holden (ice hockey) (born 1949), Canadian ice hockey player
 Bill Holden (schoolteacher) (born 1948), American schoolteacher and juvenile diabetes activist
 Bob Holden (born 1949), Governor of Missouri
 Bob Holden (racing driver) (born 1932), Australian racing driver
 Charles Holden (1875–1960), British architect
 Cliff Holden (1919-2020), English painter, designer, and silk-screen printer
 Clive Holden, Canadian multimedia artist and poet
 Constance Holden (1941–2010), American science journalist
 Craig Holden (born 1957), Australian rules footballer
 David Holden (1924–1977) British writer, journalist, and broadcaster
 David Holden (screenwriter) American TV producer and playwright
 Dean Holden (born 1979), Northern Irish professional football player
 Doug Holden (1930–2021), English footballer
 Edith Holden (1871–1920), British artist and art teacher
 Edward Holden (disambiguation)

F–J
 Frances Gillam Holden (1843–1924), Australian nurse, suffragist and writer
 Frankie J. Holden aka Frank Holden (born 1952), Australian entertainer
 Genevieve Holden (1919–2007), American novelist
 Gina Holden (born 1975), Canadian actress
 Gloria Holden (1908–1991), English actress
 Helge Holden (born 1956), Norwegian mathematician
 Henry Holden (police officer) (1823–1900), English police officer and cricketer
 Henry James Holden (1859–1926), South Australian mayor and businessman whose company became the car maker Holden
 Hubert Ashton Holden (1822–1896), English classical scholar
 Isaac Holden (1807–1897), Scottish inventor and manufacturer
 Jack Holden (disambiguation)
 James Holden (disambiguation)
 Jan Holden (1931–2005), English actress
 Jennifer Holden (born 1936), American actress
 Joanne M. Holden (born 1974), American food scientist
 Jody Holden (born 1968), Canadian beach volleyball player
 John Holden (disambiguation)
 Jon Robert Holden (born 1976), US-born naturalized Russian basketball player
 Jonathan Holden, poet laureate of Kansas
 Josh Holden (born 1978), Canadian professional ice hockey center

K–P
 Kip Holden (born 1952), American politician Melvin Lee Holden
 Kisha B. Holden, American professor of psychiatry
 Laurie Holden (born 1972), American actress
 Les Holden, Australian aviator
 Lewis Holden, New Zealand economist
 Mari Holden (born 1971), American cycle racer
 Marjean Holden, American actress
 Mark Holden (born 1954), Australian singer and television personality
 Max Holden (born 1997), English cricketer
 Max Holden (1884–1949), American stage magician and vaudeville performer
 Mel Holden (1954–1981), Scottish footballer
 Michael Holden (born 1968), British heavyweight boxer
 Moses Holden (1777–1864), English astronomer
 Nate Holden (born 1929), served on the Los Angeles City Council from 1987 to 2002
 Nick Holden (born 1987), Canadian professional ice hockey defenceman
 Oliver Holden (1765–1844), American composer and compiler of hymns
 P. J. Holden (born 1969), Northern Irish comic artist
 Perry Greeley Holden (1865–1959), first professor of agronomy in the United States

R–S
 Randall Holden, founding settler of both Portsmouth and Warwick, Rhode Island
 Rebecca Holden (born 1958), American actress, singer, and entertainer
 Reuben A. Holden III (1890–1967), American tennis player
 Richard Holden (dancer) (born 1927), American dancer and choreographer
 Richard Holden (Canadian politician) (1931–2005), Canadian lawyer and member of the National Assembly of Quebec
 Richard Holden (British politician), MP from 2019
 Rick Holden (born 1964), English football player
 Rob Holden (born 1956), British accountant
 Robert Holden (disambiguation)
 S. D. Holden (1870–1917), British engineer, son of engineer James Holden
 Stewart Holden (born 1979), British competitive Scrabble player
 Stuart Holden (born 1985), Scottish/American football player
 Svein Holden, Norwegian criminal prosecutor

T–W
 Thomas Holden (disambiguation)
 Tim Holden (born 1957), United States politician Thomas Timothy Holden
 Tony Holden (director), television producer and director
 Tore Holden (born 1946), Norwegian ice hockey referee and television personality
 Wendy Holden (author, born 1961), British journalist and author
 Wendy Holden (author, born 1965), British author of humorous novels
 Will Holden (American football) (born 1993), American football offensive tackle
 William Holden (disambiguation)

Fictional characters
 Caroline Holden, in the television series Baywatch, portrayed by Yasmine Bleeth
 Claudia Joy Holden, from Army Wives
 Jim Holden, in The Expanse science fiction novel series 
 Judge Holden, in Cormac McCarthy's novel Blood Meridian
 Martha Holden, in the soap opera Home and Away, portrayed by Jodi Gordon
 Max Holden, from One Live to Live
 Michael Holden (character), in the television series Army Wives
 The Holdens, one of the One Life to Live minor families
 Tony Holden, in the Australian television soap opera Home and Away, portrayed by Jon Sivewright
 Will Holden, in the soap opera EastEnders

See also
Holden (disambiguation)

English-language surnames